The 2022 Goalball World Championships was held in Matosinhos, Portugal from 5 to 16 December 2022.

The 2022 Goalball World Championships were scheduled to be held in Hangzhou, China, to commence Monday, 5 June 2022, although originally set for Sunday 3 to Friday 15 July 2022.  Some precursor regional championships were moved due to the ongoing COVID-19 pandemic: IBSA America moved from 6 to 13 November 2021 to 18 to 22 February 2022, and IBSA Asia moved from November 2021 to commence 21 March 2022.

By June 2022, the IBSA Asia Regional Championships were moved from South Korea to the ISA Sport City at Bahrain for July 2022, and the Centro de Desportos e Congressos de Matosinhos, Portugal, to be the location for the World Championships in December 2022.

The world title won Brazil and Turkey. For Brazil was their third world title in a row.

Medal summary

Team rosters

Men's rosters

Women's rosters

Men's event

Group C

Group D

Knockouts

Women's event

Group A

Group B

Knockouts

References

External links 
Goalball 2022

Goalball competitions
2022 in Portuguese sport
Sport in Matosinhos
Goalball World Championships